The Son of a Servant is the autobiographical novel of August Strindberg in four parts, published between 1886 and 1909.

A translation in English by CLAUD FIELD (1863–1941) was published by G.P. PUTNAM'S SONS in 1913.

External links

Autobiographical novels
Novels by August Strindberg
Swedish-language novels
Novels set in Stockholm